Ice giant, Ice Giant, ice giants or Ice Giants may refer to:
 Ice giant, a type of giant planet composed largely of 'ices', volatile materials heavier than hydrogen and helium
 Frost giants (hrímþursar) of Norse mythology
 Godlike beings in Terry Pratchett's Discworld series, see Sourcery

See also
Frost Giant (disambiguation)